Miriam Hederman O'Brien (6 June 1932 - 14 March 2022) was an Irish barrister and academic, who held the posts of Chancellor of the University of Limerick and Director of the University of Limerick Foundation.

Early years
Miriam Hederman was born in Naas, County Kildare, the youngest of three children of William and Mary Hederman, drapers in Naas and Newbridge. She had two older brothers, Supreme Court Justice and Attorney-General Anthony J. Hederman and William Hederman, a Vincentian priest.

Death
Hederman O'Brien  died 14 March 2022 at AnovoCare Nursing Home.

Affiliations

 Trustee, Louvain Development Trust for the Irish Institute for European Affairs
 Vice-President, Statistical and Social Enquiry Society of Ireland
 Guest lecturer, Department of Economics, Trinity College, Dublin
 Guest lecturer, European affairs, University College, Cork

Awards and legacy
In 2013, she was named 2013 Ireland's Most Powerful Woman.

The Miriam Hederman O'Brien Research Prize is awarded by the Foundation for Fiscal Studies.

References

Irish barristers
Irish activists
Irish women activists
Academics of the University of Limerick
Chancellors of the University of Limerick
Alumni of Trinity College Dublin
Living people
1932 births
People from Naas